Truett Henry Smith (March 17, 1924 – December 29, 2000) was an American football blocking back who played two seasons with the Pittsburgh Steelers of the National Football League (NFL). He was drafted by the Chicago Bears in the 32nd round of the 1948 NFL Draft. He was also drafted by the Steelers in the seventh round of the 1950 NFL Draft. Smith first enrolled at the University of Wyoming before transferring to Mississippi State University. He attended Hazlehurst High School in Hazlehurst, Mississippi.Coached at Mississippi College. Decorated Marine. Famously immortalized in Men of Steel for surviving after being declared KIA.

References

External links
Just Sports Stats

1924 births
2000 deaths
Players of American football from New Orleans
American football quarterbacks
Wyoming Cowboys football players
Mississippi State Bulldogs football players
Pittsburgh Steelers players